Francesco De Vita (5 January 1913, in Trapani – 2 June 1961) was an Italian politician. He represented the Italian Republican Party in the Constituent Assembly of Italy from 1946 to 1948 and in the Chamber of Deputies from 1948 to 1963.

References

1913 births
1961 deaths
People from Trapani
Italian Republican Party politicians
Members of the Constituent Assembly of Italy
Deputies of Legislature I of Italy
Deputies of Legislature II of Italy
Deputies of Legislature III of Italy
Politicians of Sicily